Brahim Djamel Kassali (11 November 1954) is the Algerian Minister of Finance. He was appointed as minister on 14 June 2022.

Education 
Kassali has a degree in financial sciences (1977) from the University of Algiers, a Diploma in Privatization and Modernization of the Public Sector in the Market Economy (1994) from the Institut international d'administration publique in Paris and a Diploma in Capital Markets Organization (1995) from the Institute of International Financial Services in Montreal.

References 

1954 births
Living people
21st-century Algerian politicians
Algerian politicians
Government ministers of Algeria
Finance ministers of Algeria
University of Algiers alumni